David Hilbert  (23 January 1862 – 14 February 1943) was a German mathematician, one of the most influential mathematicians of the 19th and early 20th centuries. Hilbert discovered and developed a broad range of fundamental ideas in many areas, including invariant theory, the calculus of variations, commutative algebra, algebraic number theory, the foundations of geometry, spectral theory of operators and its application to integral equations, mathematical physics, and the foundations of mathematics (particularly proof theory).

Hilbert adopted and defended Georg Cantor's set theory and transfinite numbers. In 1900, he presented a collection of problems that set the course for much of the mathematical research of the 20th century.

Hilbert and his students contributed significantly to establishing rigor and developed important tools used in modern mathematical physics. Hilbert is known as one of the founders of proof theory and mathematical logic.

Life

Early life and education
Hilbert, the first of two children and only son of Otto and Maria Therese (Erdtmann) Hilbert, was born in the Province of Prussia, Kingdom of Prussia, either in Königsberg (according to Hilbert's own statement) or in Wehlau (known since 1946 as Znamensk) near Königsberg where his father worked at the time of his birth.

In late 1872, Hilbert entered the Friedrichskolleg Gymnasium (Collegium fridericianum, the same school that Immanuel Kant had attended 140 years before); but, after an unhappy period, he transferred to (late 1879) and graduated from (early 1880) the more science-oriented Wilhelm Gymnasium. Upon graduation, in autumn 1880, Hilbert enrolled at the University of Königsberg, the "Albertina". In early 1882, Hermann Minkowski (two years younger than Hilbert and also a native of Königsberg but had gone to Berlin for three semesters), returned to Königsberg and entered the university. Hilbert developed a lifelong friendship with the shy, gifted Minkowski.

Career

In 1884, Adolf Hurwitz arrived from Göttingen as an Extraordinarius (i.e., an associate professor). An intense and fruitful scientific exchange among the three began, and Minkowski and Hilbert especially would exercise a reciprocal influence over each other at various times in their scientific careers. Hilbert obtained his doctorate in 1885, with a dissertation, written under Ferdinand von Lindemann, titled Über invariante Eigenschaften spezieller binärer Formen, insbesondere der Kugelfunktionen ("On the invariant properties of special binary forms, in particular the spherical harmonic functions").

Hilbert remained at the University of Königsberg as a Privatdozent (senior lecturer) from 1886 to 1895.  In 1895, as a result of intervention on his behalf by Felix Klein, he obtained the position of Professor of Mathematics at the University of Göttingen. During the Klein and Hilbert years, Göttingen became the preeminent institution in the mathematical world. He remained there for the rest of his life.

Göttingen school
Among Hilbert's students were Hermann Weyl, chess champion Emanuel Lasker, Ernst Zermelo, and Carl Gustav Hempel. John von Neumann was his assistant. At the University of Göttingen, Hilbert was surrounded by a social circle of some of the most important mathematicians of the 20th century, such as Emmy Noether and Alonzo Church.

Among his 69 Ph.D. students in Göttingen were many who later became famous mathematicians, including (with date of thesis): Otto Blumenthal (1898), Felix Bernstein (1901), Hermann Weyl (1908), Richard Courant (1910), Erich Hecke (1910), Hugo Steinhaus (1911), and Wilhelm Ackermann (1925). Between 1902 and 1939 Hilbert was editor of the Mathematische Annalen, the leading mathematical journal of the time.

Personal life

In 1892, Hilbert married Käthe Jerosch (1864–1945), who was the daughter of a Königsberg merchant, "an outspoken young lady with an independence of mind that matched [Hilbert's]." While at Königsberg they had their one child,  (1893–1969).
Franz suffered throughout his life from an undiagnosed mental illness. His inferior intellect was a terrible disappointment to his father and this misfortune was a matter of distress to the mathematicians and students at Göttingen.

Hilbert considered the mathematician Hermann Minkowski to be his "best and truest friend".

Hilbert was baptized and raised a Calvinist in the Prussian Evangelical Church. He later left the Church and became an agnostic. He also argued that mathematical truth was independent of the existence of God or other a priori assumptions. When Galileo Galilei was criticized for failing to stand up for his convictions on the Heliocentric theory, Hilbert objected: "But [Galileo] was not an idiot. Only an idiot could believe that scientific truth needs martyrdom; that may be necessary in religion, but scientific results prove themselves in due time."

Later years
Like Albert Einstein, Hilbert had closest contacts with the Berlin Group whose leading founders had studied under Hilbert in Göttingen (Kurt Grelling, Hans Reichenbach and Walter Dubislav).

Around 1925, Hilbert developed pernicious anemia, a then-untreatable vitamin deficiency whose primary symptom is exhaustion; his assistant Eugene Wigner described him as subject to "enormous fatigue" and how he "seemed quite old," and that even after eventually being diagnosed and treated, he "was hardly a scientist after 1925, and certainly not a Hilbert."

Hilbert lived to see the Nazis purge many of the prominent faculty members at University of Göttingen in 1933. Those forced out included Hermann Weyl (who had taken Hilbert's chair when he retired in 1930), Emmy Noether and Edmund Landau. One who had to leave Germany, Paul Bernays, had collaborated with Hilbert in mathematical logic, and co-authored with him the important book Grundlagen der Mathematik (which eventually appeared in two volumes, in 1934 and 1939). This was a sequel to the Hilbert–Ackermann book Principles of Mathematical Logic from 1928. Hermann Weyl's successor was Helmut Hasse.

About a year later, Hilbert attended a banquet and was seated next to the new Minister of Education, Bernhard Rust. Rust asked whether "the Mathematical Institute really suffered so much because of the departure of the Jews." Hilbert replied, "Suffered? It doesn't exist any longer, does it?"

Death

By the time Hilbert died in 1943, the Nazis had nearly completely restaffed the university, as many of the former faculty had either been Jewish or married to Jews. Hilbert's funeral was attended by fewer than a dozen people, only two of whom were fellow academics, among them Arnold Sommerfeld, a theoretical physicist and also a native of Königsberg. News of his death only became known to the wider world several months after he died.

The epitaph on his tombstone in Göttingen consists of the famous lines he spoke at the conclusion of his retirement address to the Society of German Scientists and Physicians on 8 September 1930. The words were given in response to the Latin maxim: "Ignoramus et ignorabimus" or "We do not know, we shall not know":

The day before Hilbert pronounced these phrases at the 1930 annual meeting of the Society of German Scientists and Physicians, Kurt Gödel—in a round table discussion during the Conference on Epistemology held jointly with the Society meetings—tentatively announced the first expression of his incompleteness theorem. Gödel's incompleteness theorems show that even elementary axiomatic systems such as Peano arithmetic are either self-contradicting or contain logical propositions that are impossible to prove or disprove within that system.

Contributions to mathematics and physics

Hilbert solves Gordan's Problem
Hilbert's first work on invariant functions led him to the demonstration in 1888 of his famous finiteness theorem. Twenty years earlier, Paul Gordan had demonstrated the theorem of the finiteness of generators for binary forms using a complex computational approach. Attempts to generalize his method to functions with more than two variables failed because of the enormous difficulty of the calculations involved. To solve what had become known in some circles as Gordan's Problem, Hilbert realized that it was necessary to take a completely different path. As a result, he demonstrated Hilbert's basis theorem, showing the existence of a finite set of generators, for the invariants of quantics in any number of variables, but in an abstract form. That is, while demonstrating the existence of such a set, it was not a constructive proof—it did not display "an object"—but rather, it was an existence proof and relied on use of the law of excluded middle in an infinite extension.

Hilbert sent his results to the Mathematische Annalen. Gordan, the house expert on the theory of invariants for the Mathematische Annalen, could not appreciate the revolutionary nature of Hilbert's theorem and rejected the article, criticizing the exposition because it was insufficiently comprehensive. His comment was:

Klein, on the other hand, recognized the importance of the work, and guaranteed that it would be published without any alterations. Encouraged by Klein, Hilbert extended his method in a second article, providing estimations on the maximum degree of the minimum set of generators, and he sent it once more to the Annalen. After having read the manuscript, Klein wrote to him, saying:

Later, after the usefulness of Hilbert's method was universally recognized, Gordan himself would say:

For all his successes, the nature of his proof created more trouble than Hilbert could have imagined. Although Kronecker had conceded, Hilbert would later respond to others' similar criticisms that "many different constructions are subsumed under one fundamental idea"—in other words (to quote Reid): "Through a proof of existence, Hilbert had been able to obtain a construction"; "the proof" (i.e. the symbols on the page) was "the object". Not all were convinced. While Kronecker would die soon afterwards, his constructivist philosophy would continue with the young Brouwer and his developing intuitionist "school", much to Hilbert's torment in his later years. Indeed, Hilbert would lose his "gifted pupil" Weyl to intuitionism—"Hilbert was disturbed by his former student's fascination with the ideas of Brouwer, which aroused in Hilbert the memory of Kronecker". Brouwer the intuitionist in particular opposed the use of the Law of Excluded Middle over infinite sets (as Hilbert had used it). Hilbert responded:

Axiomatization of geometry

The text Grundlagen der Geometrie (tr.: Foundations of Geometry) published by Hilbert in 1899 proposes a formal set, called Hilbert's axioms, substituting for the traditional axioms of Euclid. They avoid weaknesses identified in those of Euclid, whose works at the time were still used textbook-fashion. It is difficult to specify the axioms used by Hilbert without referring to the publication history of the Grundlagen since Hilbert changed and modified them several times. The original monograph was quickly followed by a French translation, in which Hilbert added V.2, the Completeness Axiom. An English translation, authorized by Hilbert, was made by E.J. Townsend and copyrighted in 1902. This translation incorporated the changes made in the French translation and so is considered to be a translation of the 2nd edition. Hilbert continued to make changes in the text and several editions appeared in German. The 7th edition was the last to appear in Hilbert's lifetime. New editions followed the 7th, but the main text was essentially not revised.

Hilbert's approach signaled the shift to the modern axiomatic method. In this, Hilbert was anticipated by Moritz Pasch's work from 1882.  Axioms are not taken as self-evident truths. Geometry may treat things, about which we have powerful intuitions, but it is not necessary to assign any explicit meaning to the undefined concepts. The elements, such as point, line, plane, and others, could be substituted, as Hilbert is reported to have said to Schoenflies and Kötter, by tables, chairs, glasses of beer and other such objects. It is their defined relationships that are discussed.

Hilbert first enumerates the undefined concepts: point, line, plane, lying on (a relation between points and lines, points and planes, and lines and planes), betweenness, congruence of pairs of points (line segments), and congruence of angles. The axioms unify both the plane geometry and solid geometry of Euclid in a single system.

The 23 problems

Hilbert put forth the most influential list consisting of 23 unsolved problems at the International Congress of Mathematicians in Paris in 1900. This is generally reckoned as the most successful and deeply considered compilation of open problems ever to be produced by an individual mathematician.

After re-working the foundations of classical geometry, Hilbert could have extrapolated to the rest of mathematics. His approach differed, however, from the later "foundationalist" Russell–Whitehead or "encyclopedist" Nicolas Bourbaki, and from his contemporary Giuseppe Peano. The mathematical community as a whole could engage in problems of which he had identified as crucial aspects of important areas of mathematics.

The problem set was launched as a talk "The Problems of Mathematics" presented during the course of the Second International Congress of Mathematicians held in Paris. The introduction of the speech that Hilbert gave said:

He presented fewer than half the problems at the Congress, which were published in the acts of the Congress. In a subsequent publication, he extended the panorama, and arrived at the formulation of the now-canonical 23 Problems of Hilbert. See also Hilbert's twenty-fourth problem. The full text is important, since the exegesis of the questions still can be a matter of inevitable debate, whenever it is asked how many have been solved.

Some of these were solved within a short time. Others have been discussed throughout the 20th century, with a few now taken to be unsuitably open-ended to come to closure. Some continue to remain challenges.

Formalism
In an account that had become standard by the mid-century, Hilbert's problem set was also a kind of manifesto that opened the way for the development of the formalist school, one of three major schools of mathematics of the 20th century. According to the formalist, mathematics is manipulation of symbols according to agreed upon formal rules. It is therefore an autonomous activity of thought. There is, however, room to doubt whether Hilbert's own views were simplistically formalist in this sense.

Hilbert's program

In 1920, Hilbert proposed a research project in metamathematics that became known as Hilbert's program. He wanted mathematics to be formulated on a solid and complete logical foundation. He believed that in principle this could be done by showing that:

 all of mathematics follows from a correctly chosen finite system of axioms; and
 that some such axiom system is provably consistent through some means such as the epsilon calculus.

He seems to have had both technical and philosophical reasons for formulating this proposal. It affirmed his dislike of what had become known as the ignorabimus, still an active issue in his time in German thought, and traced back in that formulation to Emil du Bois-Reymond.

This program is still recognizable in the most popular philosophy of mathematics, where it is usually called formalism. For example, the Bourbaki group adopted a watered-down and selective version of it as adequate to the requirements of their twin projects of (a) writing encyclopedic foundational works, and (b) supporting the axiomatic method as a research tool. This approach has been successful and influential in relation with Hilbert's work in algebra and functional analysis, but has failed to engage in the same way with his interests in physics and logic.

Hilbert wrote in 1919:

Hilbert published his views on the foundations of mathematics in the 2-volume work, Grundlagen der Mathematik.

Gödel's work
Hilbert and the mathematicians who worked with him in his enterprise were committed to the project. His attempt to support axiomatized mathematics with definitive principles, which could banish theoretical uncertainties, ended in failure.

Gödel demonstrated that any non-contradictory formal system, which was comprehensive enough to include at least arithmetic, cannot demonstrate its completeness by way of its own axioms. In 1931 his incompleteness theorem showed that Hilbert's grand plan was impossible as stated. The second point cannot in any reasonable way be combined with the first point, as long as the axiom system is genuinely finitary.

Nevertheless, the subsequent achievements of proof theory at the very least clarified consistency as it relates to theories of central concern to mathematicians. Hilbert's work had started logic on this course of clarification; the need to understand Gödel's work then led to the development of recursion theory and then mathematical logic as an autonomous discipline in the 1930s. The basis for later theoretical computer science, in the work of Alonzo Church and Alan Turing, also grew directly out of this "debate".

Functional analysis
Around 1909, Hilbert dedicated himself to the study of differential and integral equations; his work had direct consequences for important parts of modern functional analysis. In order to carry out these studies, Hilbert introduced the concept of an infinite dimensional Euclidean space, later called Hilbert space. His work in this part of analysis provided the basis for important contributions to the mathematics of physics in the next two decades, though from an unanticipated direction. Later on, Stefan Banach amplified the concept, defining Banach spaces. Hilbert spaces are an important class of objects in the area of functional analysis, particularly of the spectral theory of self-adjoint linear operators, that grew up around it during the 20th century.

Physics
Until 1912, Hilbert was almost exclusively a pure mathematician. When planning a visit from Bonn, where he was immersed in studying physics, his fellow mathematician and friend Hermann Minkowski joked he had to spend 10 days in quarantine before being able to visit Hilbert. In fact, Minkowski seems responsible for most of Hilbert's physics investigations prior to 1912, including their joint seminar on the subject in 1905.

In 1912, three years after his friend's death, Hilbert turned his focus to the subject almost exclusively. He arranged to have a "physics tutor" for himself. He started studying kinetic gas theory and moved on to elementary radiation theory and the molecular theory of matter. Even after the war started in 1914, he continued seminars and classes where the works of Albert Einstein and others were followed closely.

By 1907, Einstein had framed the fundamentals of the theory of gravity, but then struggled for nearly 8 years to put the theory into its final form. By early summer 1915, Hilbert's interest in physics had focused on general relativity, and he invited Einstein to Göttingen to deliver a week of lectures on the subject. Einstein received an enthusiastic reception at Göttingen. Over the summer, Einstein learned that Hilbert was also working on the field equations and redoubled his own efforts. During November 1915, Einstein published several papers culminating in The Field Equations of Gravitation (see Einstein field equations). Nearly simultaneously, Hilbert published "The Foundations of Physics", an axiomatic derivation of the field equations (see Einstein–Hilbert action). Hilbert fully credited Einstein as the originator of the theory and no public priority dispute concerning the field equations ever arose between the two men during their lives. See more at priority.

Additionally, Hilbert's work anticipated and assisted several advances in the mathematical formulation of quantum mechanics. His work was a key aspect of Hermann Weyl and John von Neumann's work on the mathematical equivalence of Werner Heisenberg's matrix mechanics and Erwin Schrödinger's wave equation, and his namesake Hilbert space plays an important part in quantum theory. In 1926, von Neumann showed that, if quantum states were understood as vectors in Hilbert space, they would correspond with both Schrödinger's wave function theory and Heisenberg's matrices.

Throughout this immersion in physics, Hilbert worked on putting rigor into the mathematics of physics. While highly dependent on higher mathematics, physicists tended to be "sloppy" with it. To a pure mathematician like Hilbert, this was both ugly, and difficult to understand. As he began to understand physics and how physicists were using mathematics, he developed a coherent mathematical theory for what he found – most importantly in the area of integral equations. When his colleague Richard Courant wrote the now classic Methoden der mathematischen Physik (Methods of Mathematical Physics) including some of Hilbert's ideas, he added Hilbert's name as author even though Hilbert had not directly contributed to the writing. Hilbert said "Physics is too hard for physicists", implying that the necessary mathematics was generally beyond them; the Courant-Hilbert book made it easier for them.

Number theory
Hilbert unified the field of algebraic number theory with his 1897 treatise Zahlbericht (literally "report on numbers"). He also resolved a significant number-theory problem formulated by Waring in 1770.  As with the finiteness theorem, he used an existence proof that shows there must be solutions for the problem rather than providing a mechanism to produce the answers. He then had little more to publish on the subject; but the emergence of Hilbert modular forms in the dissertation of a student means his name is further attached to a major area.

He made a series of conjectures on class field theory. The concepts were highly influential, and his own contribution lives on in the names of the Hilbert class field and of the Hilbert symbol of local class field theory. Results were mostly proved by 1930, after work by Teiji Takagi.

Hilbert did not work in the central areas of analytic number theory, but his name has become known for the Hilbert–Pólya conjecture, for reasons that are anecdotal.

Works
His collected works (Gesammelte Abhandlungen) have been published several times. The original versions of his papers contained "many technical errors of varying degree"; when the collection was first published, the errors were corrected and it was found that this could be done without major changes in the statements of the theorems, with one exception—a claimed proof of the continuum hypothesis. The errors were nonetheless so numerous and significant that it took Olga Taussky-Todd three years to make the corrections.

See also

Concepts

 List of things named after David Hilbert
 Foundations of geometry
 Hilbert C*-module
 Hilbert cube
 Hilbert curve
 Hilbert matrix
 Hilbert metric
 Hilbert–Mumford criterion
 Hilbert number
 Hilbert ring
 Hilbert–Poincaré series
 Hilbert series and Hilbert polynomial
 Hilbert space
 Hilbert spectrum
 Hilbert system
 Hilbert transform
 Hilbert's arithmetic of ends
 Hilbert's paradox of the Grand Hotel
 Hilbert–Schmidt operator
 Hilbert–Smith conjecture

Theorems
 Hilbert–Burch theorem
 Hilbert's irreducibility theorem
 Hilbert's Nullstellensatz
 Hilbert's theorem (differential geometry)
 Hilbert's Theorem 90
 Hilbert's syzygy theorem
 Hilbert–Speiser theorem

Other
 Brouwer–Hilbert controversy
 Direct method in the calculus of variations
 Entscheidungsproblem
 Geometry and the Imagination
 General relativity priority dispute

Footnotes

Citations

Sources

Primary literature in English translation
 
 1918. "Axiomatic thought," 1114–1115.
 1922. "The new grounding of mathematics: First report," 1115–1133.
 1923. "The logical foundations of mathematics," 1134–1147.
 1930. "Logic and the knowledge of nature," 1157–1165.
 1931. "The grounding of elementary number theory," 1148–1156.
 1904. "On the foundations of logic and arithmetic," 129–138.
 1925. "On the infinite," 367–392.
 1927. "The foundations of mathematics," with comment by Weyl and Appendix by Bernays, 464–489.

Secondary literature
 , available at Gallica. The "Address" of Gabriel Bertrand of 20 December 1943 at the French Academy: he gives biographical sketches of the lives of recently deceased members, including Pieter Zeeman, David Hilbert and Georges Giraud.
 Bottazzini Umberto, 2003. Il flauto di Hilbert. Storia della matematica. UTET, 
 Corry, L., Renn, J., and Stachel, J., 1997, "Belated Decision in the Hilbert-Einstein Priority Dispute," Science 278: nn-nn.
 
 Dawson, John W. Jr 1997. Logical Dilemmas: The Life and Work of Kurt Gödel. Wellesley MA: A. K. Peters. .
 
 Grattan-Guinness, Ivor, 2000. The Search for Mathematical Roots 1870–1940. Princeton Univ. Press.
 Gray, Jeremy, 2000. The Hilbert Challenge. 
 
 Mehra, Jagdish, 1974. Einstein, Hilbert, and the Theory of Gravitation. Reidel.
 Piergiorgio Odifreddi, 2003. Divertimento Geometrico. Le origini geometriche della logica da Euclide a Hilbert. Bollati Boringhieri, . A clear exposition of the "errors" of Euclid and of the solutions presented in the Grundlagen der Geometrie, with reference to non-Euclidean geometry.
  The definitive English-language biography of Hilbert.
 
 
 
Sieg, Wilfried, and Ravaglia, Mark, 2005, "Grundlagen der Mathematik" in Grattan-Guinness, I., ed., Landmark Writings in Western Mathematics. Elsevier: 981-99. (in English)
 Thorne, Kip, 1995. Black Holes and Time Warps: Einstein's Outrageous Legacy,  W. W. Norton & Company; Reprint edition. .

External links

 Hilbert Bernays Project
 Hilbert's 23 Problems Address
 ICMM 2014 dedicated to the memory of D.Hilbert
 
 
 
 Hilbert's radio speech recorded in Königsberg 1930 (in German) , with English translation 
 Wolfram MathWorld – Hilbert'Constant
 
 
 'From Hilbert's Problems to the Future', lecture by Professor Robin Wilson, Gresham College, 27 February 2008 (available in text, audio and video formats).
 

 
1862 births
1943 deaths
19th-century German mathematicians
20th-century German mathematicians
Foreign Members of the Royal Society
Foreign associates of the National Academy of Sciences
German agnostics
Formalism (deductive)
Former Protestants
Geometers
Mathematical analysts
Number theorists
Operator theorists
Scientists from Königsberg
People from the Province of Prussia
Recipients of the Pour le Mérite (civil class)
German relativity theorists
Academic staff of the University of Göttingen
University of Königsberg alumni
Academic staff of the University of Königsberg